"Just Got to Be" is a single by The Black Keys. It is from the album Magic Potion. It was released on August 6, 2007. It was featured on the soundtrack of the 2007 video game NHL 08, and used in the AT&T commercial "Stage Presence" for the Windows Phone.

Music video
The music video for "Just Got to Be" was directed by Peter Zavadil. It shows Patrick Carney and Dan Auerbach performing on a stage in the Akron Italian Center without an audience.

Track listing
Written by Dan Auerbach and Patrick Carney.
 "Just Got to Be"
 "Black Door"

Personnel
Patrick Carney – drums
Dan Auerbach – guitars, vocals

References

The Black Keys songs
2007 songs
Songs written by Dan Auerbach
Songs written by Patrick Carney
Music videos directed by Peter Zavadil